The Holody Trophy, awarded annually to the regular season champion of the Midwest division in the Ontario Hockey League. The trophy was first given out in the 1998-99 season with the realignment of the League into four divisions. It is named for Joe Holody, the former owner and governor of the Guelph Platers and Owen Sound Platers franchise.

Winners
List of winners of the Holody Trophy.

References

External links
 Ontario Hockey League

Ontario Hockey League trophies and awards
Awards established in 1999
1999 establishments in Ontario